IBM railway station (formerly known as IBM Halt) is a currently disused railway station on the Inverclyde Line,  west of .

Clinging to the south slope of Spango Valley on the Glasgow-Wemyss Bay line, IBM Halt was opened on 9 May 1978 by British Rail to serve what was at that time a thriving IBM computer manufacturing plant, employing over 4,000 people. Originally, the stop was unadvertised and only peak-time services stopped there, but subsequently the station was publicly advertised, and all but one service stopped there. At the time the service was suspended it was served by an hourly service in each direction.

As the name suggests, the station was located within the confines of a large facility formerly owned entirely by IBM, a major employer for the town of Greenock until the plant closed. Parts of the site were sold off to companies such as Sanmina-SCI and Lenovo, which have now closed as well. By June 2009, half of the buildings had been demolished, and the site was re-branded as Valley Park. Despite that, the station name did not change. Due to its location away from major housing areas and other transport links, the station was used primarily by people employed in Valley Park, but access to the station by the general public was possible.

Until 16 May 1983, it was the only station to have the suffix "halt" (two others have it now, Coombe Junction and St Keyne Wishing Well on the Looe Valley Line in Cornwall). By 1974, the term "halt" had been removed from British Rail timetables, station signs, and other official documents. The return of the term came in 1978 for the opening of IBM Halt, and in the renaming of the two Cornish stations in 2008.

Service suspension

The station had its service suspended with effect from 9 December 2018, with ScotRail citing low patronage and anti-social behaviour on the nearby derelict IBM site. Services may be re-introduced once the site is rebuilt, although there is no fixed timeline for that to happen. A planning application for a mixed-use development on the IBM site, which would involve the reopening of the station, was submitted in February 2020.

Services
Despite that, the annual patronage declined dramatically, from well over 100,000, to about 500 when the services were suspended.

References

Disused railway stations in Greenock
Railway stations opened by British Rail
Railway stations in Great Britain opened in 1978
Railway stations in Great Britain closed in 2018
IBM facilities